A vehicle licence (also called a vehicle registration certificate in some jurisdictions) is issued by a motor registration authority in a jurisdiction in respect of a particular motor vehicle. A current licence is required for a motor vehicle to be legally permitted to be used or kept on a public road in the jurisdiction. Usually a licence is valid for one year and an annual licence fee is payable before a new one is issued.

A vehicle licence may be a paper document to be kept in the vehicle at all times. This may be in the form of an adhesive sticker to be affixed or displayed on the windshield of the vehicle or on the registration plate. In some countries, such as the UK, the paper document has been replaced by an electronic record. Authorities can confirm a valid licence via a computer check on the vehicles number plate.

The rules of vehicle licensing are in addition to those of vehicle registration, roadworthiness certification and insurance and other requirements.

Many jurisdictions have ceased issuing or requiring display of  registration certificates and have instead adopted number plate recognition systems.

General
In some countries, such as Norway, the owner annually used to get a sticker to place on the registration plate, if the vehicle is permitted for driving.

United States and Canada
In the United States and Canada, an annual or biennial sticker is usually applied to the plate, with a few exceptions. For example, the District of Columbia and a few U.S. states use windscreen stickers, and some U.S. and Canadian jurisdictions issue permanent fleet licence plates. Also, some U.S. states, such as Virginia, require that a motorist obtain a vehicle licence from the city, county, or town government in addition to registering the vehicle with the appropriate agency of the state government, or, in some cases, the federal government.

Some of these jurisdictions have done away with the sticker, leaving registration status available only from a centralized database which authorities reference (by hand, or via automated number plate recognition).

Australia
In Australia, historically a current registration sticker was required to be displayed on the windscreen of all vehicles, but all states and territories have now ceased issuing such stickers for light vehicles and adopted number plate recognition systems.

Western Australia has not required the display of a sticker since January 2010 and South Australia and Tasmania also do not require a sticker to be displayed.

New South Wales ceased issuing registration stickers for light vehicles on 1 January 2013; Victoria ceased on 1 January 2014; Northern Territory and the Australian Capital Territory ceased on 1 July 2014; and Queensland ceased on 1 October 2014.

United Kingdom 

In the United Kingdom, vehicle excise duty was introduced in 1888, and between 1920 and 1 October 2014  the vehicle licence, colloquially known as a "tax disc", came in the form of a paper disc 75 millimetres (3 inches) in diameter to be displayed on the inside of a vehicle's front windscreen, and was evidence that the necessary vehicle excise duty had been paid for the vehicle.

From 1 October 2014 the physical paper disc was no longer issued, with enforcement of the taxation now being done through the automatic number plate recognition (ANPR) system. The Daily Telegraph reported in November 2017 that road tax evasion had tripled as a result of tax discs no longer being produced.

Germany 

In Germany, a driver is required to carry a vehicle licence (called the "Fahrzeugschein") containing vehicle owner data, technical specifications and car modifications. Additionally, each car has two registration plate stickers, one to confirm the car has been properly registered, and one to indicate it has passed its vehicle inspection (Hauptuntersuchung or HU) and the date by which the next inspection is due. While the vehicle licence and the registration sticker are permanent, the vehicle inspection sticker is renewed after each inspection.

Guernsey

In Guernsey road tax and the display of a tax disc was abolished in 2008 when fuel tax was increased by 14p per litre. Vehicles now display an insurance certificate.

Ireland 
In Ireland, a tax disc must also be displayed, which is of the same format as that in the UK. However, in addition, a square insurance "disc" must also be displayed to show that the vehicle has the legally required third party insurance. Private cars over 4 years old require a similar format "disc" from the National Car Test service to show roadworthiness.

Malta
In Malta, tax discs are very similar in appearance to their UK counterparts, and are also required to be visible on the left-hand side of the windscreen. The disc proves that the vehicle has valid insurance, and that it has passed its Vehicle Roadworthiness Test (VRT).

Sri Lanka 
In Sri Lanka, a revenue licence must be displayed on the vehicle, and is evidence that the necessary vehicle excise duty has been paid for the specific vehicle. It is normally placed on the left side of the windscreen if it is a four-wheeled vehicle. A revenue licence is issued for a period of one year and must be renewed annually, during which an emissions test must be performed.

See also
Velology – the collection of tax discs and their history and design.

References 

Car tax rules UK government webpage

External links 
Tax your vehicle from GOV.UK government website

Licenses
Vehicle taxes